= Felleng Mamakeka Makeka =

Lesotho Ambassador to the United Kingdom
- In office 30 September 2013 – 3 October 2015

Personal details
- Born: 11 February 1953 (age 73)

Felleng Mamakeka Makeka is a diplomat for Lesotho.

Makeka was Lesotho's diplomat to the United Kingdom from 2013 to 2015, as High Commissioner for the Kingdom of Lesotho. She was recalled in 2015 to Lesotho following a change in the government.
